Clube Atlético Cassilandense, commonly known as Cassilandense, was a Brazilian football team based in Cassilândia, Mato Grosso do Sul state.

History
The club was founded on 5 July 1986. Cassilandense finished in the second position in the Campeonato Sul-Mato-Grossense in 1995 and in 2001.

Stadium
Clube Atlético Cassilandense played their home games at Estádio Horácio Cesário. The stadium had a maximum capacity of 5,000 people.

References

Defunct football clubs in Mato Grosso do Sul
Association football clubs established in 1986
Association football clubs disestablished in 2008
1986 establishments in Brazil
2008 disestablishments in Brazil